4 (Ensemble) Compositions (1992) is an album by American saxophonist and composer Anthony Braxton recorded in 1993 for the Italian Black Saint label.

Reception
The Allmusic review by Brian Olewnick awarded the album 4 stars stating "Listeners who might be cautious about the more arcane aspects of his work will find a relatively accessible introduction to Braxton's "classical" leanings herein as will others interested in the state of contemporary, creative orchestral writing. A rewarding, challenging effort".

Track listing
All compositions by Anthony Braxton.

 "Composition 100" – 15:41 
 "Composition 96" – 10:16 
 "Composition 164" – 23:09 
 "Composition 163" – 24:09

Personnel
Anthony Braxton – conductor  
Robert Rumboltz – trumpet
Roland Dahinden, John Rapson – trombone
Don Byron – clarinet, bass clarinet
Marty Ehrlich – flute, clarinet, alto saxophone, tenor saxophone, piccolo
J. D. Parran – flute, bamboo flute, clarinet, alto clarinet, bass clarinet
Randy McKean – clarinet, bass clarinet, alto saxophone
Ted Reichman – accordion
Guy Klucevsek– accordion, bodysounds
Amina Claudine Myers – organ
Jay Hoggard – vibraphone, marimba
Warren Smith – percussion
Lynden Achee – steel drums
Anne LeBaron, harp
Mastered at PhonoComp in Tribiano, Italy.

References

Black Saint/Soul Note albums
Anthony Braxton albums
1993 albums